Oneroa is a Cook Islands electoral division returning one member to the Cook Islands Parliament.  Its current representative is Wesley Kareroa, who has held the seat since 2014.

The electorate consists of the districts of Keia, Tavaenga, and Veitatei on the island of Mangaia.  It was created in 1981, when the Constitution Amendment (No. 9) Act 1980–1981 adjusted electorate boundaries and split the electorate of Mangaia into three.

Electoral results

References

Mangaia
Cook Islands electorates